Hochster v De La Tour  is a landmark English contract law case on anticipatory breach of contract. It held that if a contract is repudiated before the date of performance, damages may be claimed immediately.

Facts
In April, De La Tour agreed to employ Hochster as his courier for three months from 1 June 1852, to go on a trip around the European continent. On 11 May, De La Tour wrote to say that Hochster was no longer needed. On 22 May, Hochster sued. De La Tour argued that Hochster was still under an obligation to stay ready and willing to perform till the day when performance was due, and therefore could commence no action before.

Judgment
Lord Campbell CJ held that Hochster did not need to wait until the date performance was due to commence the action and awarded damages.

See also

Vitol SA v Norelf Ltd (or The Santa Clara) [1996] 3 All ER 971
White & Carter (Councils) Ltd v McGregor [1962] AC 413

Notes

References
C Mitchell and P Mitchell (eds), Landmark Cases in the Law of Contract (2008)

English termination case law
1853 in case law
1853 in British law
Court of King's Bench (England) cases